South Eastern Pirkanmaa  was a subdivision of Pirkanmaa and one of the Sub-regions of Finland.

Former sub-regions of Finland
Geography of Pirkanmaa